Huncovce (Unsdorf) is a village and municipality in Kežmarok District in the Prešov Region of north Slovakia.

Geography 
The municipality lies at an altitude of 639 metres and covers an area of 13.262 km2.
It has a population of about 2400 people.

History
The village belonged to a German language island. The German population was expelled in 1945.

People 
 David Friesenhausen (1750, Friesenhausen - 1828, Gyulafehérvár/Alba Iulia), a Jewish Bavarian-Hungarian Talmudist, scientist, mathematician, Hebrew-language writer; lived here
 Solomon Winter (1778, ?, in the Szepes - ), Jewish Hungarian philanthropist; lived and died here

See also
 List of municipalities and towns in Slovakia

References

Genealogical resources

The records for genealogical research are available at the state archive "Statny Archiv in Levoca, Slovakia"

 Roman Catholic church records (births/marriages/deaths): 1675-1899 (parish A)
 Lutheran church records (births/marriages/deaths): 1784-1944 (parish B)

External links 
 https://web.archive.org/web/20070513023228/http://www.statistics.sk/mosmis/eng/run.html
Surnames of living people in Huncovce

Villages and municipalities in Kežmarok District
Hungarian German communities
Historic Jewish communities in Europe
Shtetls